Meg Duffy is an American musician and guitarist who has played as a studio musician on records by The War on Drugs, Weyes Blood, Perfume Genius, Sasami, and William Tyler, among many others. Duffy was also a longtime member of Kevin Morby's live band, and is the sole member of indie-rock band Hand Habits.

Background 
Duffy is originally from Amsterdam, New York, and first started playing guitar at 17, although they had played drums since 5th grade. After graduating from high school, Duffy attended Schenectady County Community College for guitar performance. After graduating from college they briefly relocated to Albany, New York, prior to joining Morby's band in Los Angeles, California. Duffy uses non-binary gender-neutral pronouns.

Session work 
Duffy is credited on a number of albums as a session musician. They played a slide guitar solo on "Holding On" off The War on Drugs' Grammy-winning album A Deeper Understanding, and in 2019 they played on William Tyler's instrumental album Goes West. Duffy contributed guitar, slide guitar, and bass on the albums Fading Lines (2016) and European Heartbreak (2018) by Dutch artist Amber Arcades. Duffy played slide guitar on "Seven Words", a 2016 track from the album Front Row Seat to Earth by Weyes Blood. Duffy appeared on Mega Bog's albums Happy Together (2017) and Dolphine (2019). Duffy was a regular member of indie rock musician Kevin Morby's live band from 2015 to 2018, and played guitar, piano, and bass on his 2017 album City Music.

Duffy collaborated with music Jenn Wasner on Wasner's second album as Flock of Dimes, Head of Roses. They are also heavily featured in Sylvan Esso's expanded live band from their WITH tour, of which a full-length concert film and double LP WITH was released. Duffy also performed on the follow up EP, WITH LOVE.

Their other latest credits include playing guitar on SASAMI's 2022 album Squeeze, Christian Lee Hutson's Quitters, Weyes Blood's And In the Darkness, Hearts Aglow, Mega Bog's Life, and Another, and many more.

Equipment 
Duffy plays a Fender Lone Star Stratocaster with a rosewood fretboard. The guitar is set up with Seymour Duncan pickups in a HSS configuration (a single coil at the neck position, a single coil in the middle position and a humbucker at the bridge position.), also known as a “fat strat”.

Hand Habits 

Duffy is the founder, primary songwriter, and only permanent member of the Los Angeles-based band Hand Habits. Their first release as Hand Habits was a 2012 split record titled Small Shifts (included as part of the pinky demos). On September 25, 2015, Hand Habits released double EPs titled This Sounds Like Nothing Tonight and This Sounds Like Nothing Before. Their first full length record Wildly Idle (Humble Before the Void) was released by Woodsist Records in 2017. Wildy Idle was self-produced by Duffy and recorded partially in Saugerties, New York and partially at their home in Highland Park. Kevin Morby said about the album: "Wildly Idle feels incredibly intimate, like a secret between her and the listener. It hits soft, like warm water, and before you know it it is all around you – a bath, and Meg's whisper has made its way inside you". In reviewing the album for Pitchfork, Quinn Moreland wrote: "Duffy sings of romances come and gone without ever sounding jaded or spiteful; future love promises a mystery, a sensuality that’s open like the road".

On March 1, 2019 Hand Habits released their second studio album, placeholder, produced by Brad Cook in Justin Vernon's Wisconsin studio. Duffy stated that the songs on placeholder "are about accountability and forgiveness .... These are all real stories. I don't fictionalize much".

In 2020, Hand Habits released singles "Pictures of Flowers", a collaboration with Jess Williamson, and "Comfortable", a collaboration with Ryan Hemsworth. They released their EP dirt in February 2021, and in June of that same year, they released the singles "motherless" and "no reply", produced by Luke Temple and Jeremy Harris.

Duffy's collaborative project with producer Joel Ford, yes/and, debuted with a self-titled album in July 2021.

In August 2021, Hand Habits announced their upcoming album Fun House, and released the first single "Aquamarine". The album, which was produced by Sasami and engineered by Kyle Thomas, was released on October 22, 2021. In their positive review of the album, Pitchfork noted: "[Fun House] embodies all Duffy’s gifts at once, bringing their virtuosic talent into their own wheelhouse, on their own terms." The FADER dubbed the album a "breakthrough," with Shaad D'Souza writing that the album is "lush, bright, in constant forward motion, in a constant state of change... Duffy’s third and best record, it possesses some grimy, earthen magic."

On September 14, 2022, Hand Habits released two new songs "Greatest Weapon," a song about "coming to grips with the dance of time,"  and "Under The Water" via Sylvan Esso's Psychic Hotline label. The latter track is a collaboration between Duffy and Sylvan Esso's Amelia Meath.

Discography (as Hand Habits)

LP 
 Wildly Idle (Humble Before the Void) (2017)
 placeholder (2019)
 yes/and (2021) (collaboration with Joel Ford)
 Fun House (2021)
 Fun House + Blueprints (2022)

EP 
 pinky demos (2012)
 Small Shifts (2014)
 This Sounds Nothing Like Tonight (2015)
 This Sounds Nothing Like Before (2015)
 Dirt (2021)

Singles 
 "Yr Heart" (2017)
 "Pictures of Flowers" (2020) (collaboration with Jess Williamson)
 "Comfortable"(2020) (collaboration with Ryan Hemsworth)
 "4th of July" (2021)
 "motherless" (2021)
 "no reply" (2021)
 "Aquamarine" (2021)
 "No Difference" (2021)
 "Graves" (2021)
 "Clean Air" (2021)
 "Greatest Weapon" (2022)
 "Under The Water" (2022) (collaboration with Amelia Meath)

Live albums 
 Audiotree Live (2017)

Additional credits and collaborations 
Full list of additional credits/collaborations showing year, album, artist, and credit

References 

Living people
Year of birth missing (living people)
Non-binary musicians
American folk guitarists
American rock guitarists
People from Amsterdam, New York
Saddle Creek Records artists